The Myanmar Chess Federation is the governing body for chess competition in Myanmar. Founded in 1972, it joined FIDE, the International Chess Federation, in 1990. It is also a member of the ASEAN Chess Confederation.

The federation organizes the annual Myanmar National Chess Championship.

See also
 Sittuyin (Traditional Burmese chess)

References

Chess in Myanmar
Sports organizations established in 1972